Church of San Giovanni Battista may refer to:
 San Giovanni Battista, Praiano, Italy
 Church of San Giovanni Battista, Mogno, Switzerland